Mama Moo or Mamma Moo is a fictional character created by Jujja and Tomas Wieslander that first appeared in a Swedish children's radio drama and then later on LP albums (Min lilla kråksång and Mamma Mu where the crow was voiced by Anders Ågren), books illustrated by Sven Nordqvist, a computer game and other merchandise. This series is about Mamma Moo—a talking cow and her best friend, a crow.

The Swedish books were published by Natur och Kultur and are translated to over 30 languages.

Books about Mama Moo 
Mamma Mu gungar (1993) (Mama Moo on a Swing)
Mamma Mu åker bobb (1994)
Mamma Mu bygger koja (1995)
Mamma Mu och Kråkan (1996)
Mamma Mu städar (1997)
Mamma Mu åker rutschkana (2003) (Mamma Moo Goes Down a Slide)
Mamma Mu klättrar i träd (2005)
Mamma Mu får ett sår (2006)
Mamma Mu och Kråkans jul (2008)

References

External links 
Mamma Mu's webpage

Fictional cattle
Series of children's books
Swedish children's literature
Characters in children's literature
Natur & Kultur books